Pteriidae, also called the feather oysters, is a family of medium-sized to large saltwater clams. They are pearl oysters, marine bivalve molluscs in the order Pteriida.

Some of the species in this family are important economically as the source of saltwater pearls.

Genera
Genera in the family Pteriidae include:
 Crenatula Lamarck, 1803
 Electroma Stoliczka, 1871
 Pinctada Röding, 1798
 Pteria Scopoli, 1777 - winged oysters
 Vulsella Röding, 1798

References

 Powell A. W. B., New Zealand Mollusca, William Collins Publishers Ltd, Auckland, New Zealand 1979 

 
Bivalve families